Alison Garrigan aka Alison Hernan (born September 1958) is an American actress, singer, and costume designer, the daughter of actors Jonathan and Jo Farwell. She is well known for playing both male and female roles.

Career
She has performed in gothic/industrial bands as well and has a cabaret/nightclub act with Michael Seevers called Torch. She is a self-described "goth-punk vampire bat". She and co-writer/guitarist Dennis Yurich reformed their Goth/Steampunk band "Queue Up" in 2008.

She appeared in David Hansen's I Hate This.

She is married, mother of a grown up son, and is openly bisexual.

She played Dr. Frank-N-Furter in Cleveland Public Theatre's Christmas production of "The Rocky Horror Show" in 2006, having previously played the part of Janet.

In January 2007 she starred in Ms. Adventures, 'a one-woman safari through the American gender jungle' by Michael Sepesy. The show was revived in 2008.

In December 2007 she appeared in the musical Pulp. Of her part it was said, "It's Alison Garrigan's Viviane, however, that dominates. The constantly employed Garrigan, whether in musical or straight parts, never fails to impress" and "[Garrigan] slinks around in a gown (she's also the costume designer) in a way sure to excite folks of any sexual orientation.". About her part in The Breakup Notebook: The Lesbian Musical in February 2008 it was said, "At the peak of comic perfection, Alison Garrigan etches out a nervous lesbian with bisexual pretensions".

Roles
Male
 Dr. Frank-N-Furter in The Rocky Horror Show
 Yitzhak in Hedwig and the Angry Inch
 Cassius in Shakespeare's Julius Caesar
 Earl of Kent in King Lear

Female
 Zillah in Bright Room Called Day
 Morgan le Fey in Discordia
 Elaine in The Dying Gaul
 Delilah Strict in Zombie Prom
 Mazeppa in Gypsy
 Miss Delilah Strict in Zombie Prom
 The occult tattoo artist in Rinde Eckert's opera Highway Ulysses
 Susan in The Secretaries
 Hester Salomon in Equus
 Viviane in the musical Pulp
 Mrs. Lovett in "Sweeney Todd"

Directing credits
Antony and Cleopatra
The Alice Seed (Cleveland Public Theater)
Kill Will (Cleveland Public Theater and Minnesota Fringe Festival)
And Then You Die (Cleveland Public Theater and New York Fringe Festival)
Othello (Bad Epitaph Theater Company)
The Vampyres (Cleveland Public Theater)
Hedwig and the Angry Inch (Yurich Productions)

References

External links
 ‘The Diary of Anne Frank’ a stellar Beck production Review in Cleveland Jewish News.

1958 births
Living people
American musical theatre actresses
American rock musicians
American stage actresses
Bisexual actresses
Bisexual musicians
Gothic rock musicians
American LGBT singers
21st-century American women
American bisexual actors